Sergei Mikhailovitch Timchenko (born 29 July 1972, in Krashyi Lutch) is a Ukrainian politician, chairman of Ukrainian State Agency of land resources (2011—2014).

Biography 
Sergei Timchenko was born 29 July 1972 Krashyi Lutch of Lugansk region. At the age of 6, he started to go in for boxing and then became a junior champion of Ukraine twice (1984, 1985).

In 2003 graduated Donbass mining and metallurgical Institute, in 2008 — Donetsk State University of Management (master's degree in management of foreign economic activity), in 2012 — Kharkiv national agrarian University named after V. V. Dokuchaev (master of management of foreign economic activity, land surveyor).

Married, has 4 children.

Career 
Worked as deputy Director of the  Motor Plus ltd. in Lugansk. In 2003—2005 was the head of organizational Department and deputy chairman of Lugansk regional branch of the Party of Regions. In 2005—2007 was the assistant to the people's Deputy of Ukraine in the Verkhovna Rada.

In 2007—2008 he was first Deputy Director General of the Center of the state land cadastre at the State Committee of Ukraine on land resources.

Since 2008 to 2010 worked as adviser to the Secretary of the national security and defense Council of Ukraine Raisa Bogatyrova.

In 2010 spearheaded The main Department of control over the improvement of Kiev, and then was appointed as deputy general Director — manager of technical programs in Center of the state land cadastre.

Since June 2011 to March 2014 was the chairman of  State Agency of land resources of Ukraine. Among the main achievements of the Agency at the period of Sergei Timtchenko's management the experts mark to opening of State land cadastre of Ukraine at the 1st of January 2013.

Timchenko also held a number of positions in sports organizations:
 2006—2012 — Chairman of the Board of Trustees of the Boxing Federation of Lviv region of Ukraine;
 2012—2017 — Chairman of the Board of Trustees of MMA Russia;
 2008—2015 — President and founder of the Combat club Power of Siberia Woodang in China (TIM CHEN CO).

Lives in USA since 2017. Founded the International Institute of Strategic Land Reforms in Princeton, New Jersey.

Awards 
 2012 — Order of Merit, 3rd class.
 2013 — Medal of the Cabinet of Ministers of Ukraine.
 2014 — Award of the Union of MMA by Fedor Emelianenko.

References 

1972 births
Living people
Donetsk State University of Management alumni
Recipients of the Order of Merit (Ukraine), 3rd class
Ukrainian politicians